Percy Thomas Parratt (27 February 1887 – 1 May 1971) was an Australian rules footballer who played 195 games for the Fitzroy Football Club in the Victorian Football League (VFL) from 1909 to 1923, kicking 202 goals.

Football
He started out at Rose of Northcote.

Notes

References 
 Freake, J. (1935), "Golden Days of Partnership with Percy Parratt, The Sporting Globe, (Saturday, 7 September 1935), p.7.
 de Lacy, H.A. (1941), "Unforgettable Characters in Football: Dual Personality: Percy Parratt and Jimmy Freake", The Sporting Globe, (Saturday, 28 June 1941), p.6.

External links 

Percy Parratt at Blueseum

1887 births
1971 deaths
Australian Rules footballers: place kick exponents
Fitzroy Football Club players
Fitzroy Football Club Premiership players
Carlton Football Club coaches
Geelong Football Club coaches
Fitzroy Football Club coaches
Fitzroy Football Club Premiership coaches
Australian rules footballers from Melbourne
Three-time VFL/AFL Premiership players
One-time VFL/AFL Premiership coaches
People from Collingwood, Victoria